Tulare apple mosaic virus (TAMV) is a plant pathogenic virus of the family Bromoviridae.

External links
 ICTVdB - The Universal Virus Database: Tulare apple mosaic virus
 Family Groups - The Baltimore Method

Bromoviridae
Viral plant pathogens and diseases